Donal Sheehan (1940 – 18 July 2021) was an Irish hurler. He played hurling at club level with Na Piarsaigh and at inter-county level as a member of the Cork senior hurling team.

Career

Sheehan joined the Na Piarsaigh club at a young age and played in all grades up to senior before being drafted onto the Cork senior hurling team. He made his first appearance for team as a centre-forward during the 1962 Munster Championship. Sheehan was off and on the team at various times over the following few seasons and was a non-playing substitute when the team won the All-Ireland Championship in 1966. He had earlier won a Munster Championship medal as a substitute.

Death

Sheehan died at Cork University Hospital on 18 July 2021.

Honours

Na Piarsaigh
Cork Intermediate Football Championship: 1966

Cork
All-Ireland Senior Hurling Championship: 1966
Munster Senior Hurling Championship: 1966

References

1940 births
2021 deaths
Na Piarsaigh hurlers
Cork inter-county hurlers